The 2011–12 Franchise One Day Cup was a domestic one-day cricket championship in South Africa. The tournament was without a title sponsor this season, having previously been called the MTN40 (and would become the Momentum One Day Cup the following year). It was the 31st time the championship was contested. In a change from previous seasons, matches were played over 50 overs per side instead of 40. The first match was played on 2 November 2011 and the final was on 9 December 2011 at Newlands Cricket Ground in Cape Town. The trophy was won by the Cape Cobras after they defeated the Warriors in the final.

The format of the groups stage reverted to a single group with home and away matches played between all franchises. The 13 players per side innovation trialed during the 2010–11 MTN40 was scrapped.

Group stage

Points table

Knockout stage
Of the 6 participants, the following 3 teams qualified for the knockout stage:

Semi-final

Final

Statistics

Most Runs

Source: Cricinfo

Most Wickets

Source: Cricinfo

External links
 Series home at ESPN Cricinfo

References 

South African domestic cricket competitions
Franchise One Day Cup